The 2014 Liga Nusantara Aceh season is the first edition of Liga Nusantara Aceh is a qualifying round of the 2014 Liga Nusantara.

The competition scheduled starts in May 2014.

Teams
This season there are 23 Aceh club participants.

References 

Aceh